The Brazilian Tennis Confederation ( or CBT) is the governing body of tennis in Brazil. CBT is responsible for the organization of events such as the Brasil Open and for representing tennis players in Brazil.

External links
CBT Official site

National members of the South America Tennis Confederation
 
Tennis
1955 establishments in Brazil